The men's high jump at the 2012 European Athletics Championships was held at the Helsinki Olympic Stadium on 27 and 29 June.

Medalists

Records

Schedule

Results

Qualification
Qualification: Qualification Performance 2.28 (Q) or at least 12 best performers advance to the final

Final

References

Qualification Results
Final Results

High jump
High jump at the European Athletics Championships